Nesli Çölgeçen (born 1955, Manisa) is a Turkish film director, and screen writer. He graduated from the Faculty of Political Sciences of Ankara University in 1976. Since 1979 he has been a filmmaker.

Filmography

Director 

Kardeşim Benim (1983)
Züğürt Ağa (the Agha) (1985)
Selamsız Bandosu (1987)
İmdat ile Zarife (Imdat and Zarife)(1991)
Oyunbozan (2001)
Ah Be Istanbul(2004) Televizyon mini-dizi
Son Buluşma (The Last Meeting) (2007)
Denizden Gelen (2010)

References

1955 births
Living people
Turkish film directors
People from Manisa
Turkish male screenwriters